Oradel Industrial Center is located in the city of Nuevo Laredo, Tamaulipas, Mexico. It is an industrial zone funded in 2000 and located on the route that connects the East Zone of the United States with Mexico (11.99 miles away of the World Trade International Bridge).

Oradel Industrial Center was born from the union of three developers: Blokk Properties, Cargoquin Group and Mondlak Developments. Currently, the Industrial Center specializes in the development of industrial warehouses for manufacturing and storage warehouses for inventory and logistics and it has 14 buildings built.

Infrastructure 
Oradel has a total area of 1,200 hectares. Currently, it has 14 built industrial buildings, equivalent to 31.82 hectares. On the other hand, within the development is located "El Campanario and Oradel Village" (a complex of more than 5,000 homes of Infonavit.), the Technological University of Nuevo Laredo and "Un sólo Corazón", a daycare center of the IMSS.

The Industrial Park has a corporate government and an operational base of more than 30 people who are responsible for its maintenance.

In the Industrial Park a total of 12 tenant companies coexist, among them Rheem , Ezo Tube Solutions, Caterpillar, Medline Industries, Smurfit Kappa, Cryptex, Ravisa, PSC Maquiladora, Novamex, Remy International Inc., Cargoquin, and GST Autoleather (which has Seton Company Inc. as a subsidiary).

References 

La Razón Newspaper (August 20, 2018). www.razon.com.mx. Governor of Tamaulipas inaugurates the ship X of Oradel Industrial Park. Retrieved on January 2, 2019.

Info7. (03 Agosto, 2008). www.info7.mx. Ferrovial starts in Oradel Industrial Park. Retrieved on January 2, 2019.

Summit Report: Mexico empowering ownership (first part). Art: American-style facilities south of the border. Page 9. Retrieved on January 8, 2019.

El Semanario Newspaper (18 Agosto, 2018) Oradel Industrial Park promotes innovation and growth in Nuevo Laredo  Retrieved on April 16, 2019.

El Mañana Newspaper (09 Mayo, 2017) It will operate Remy company in Oradel. Retrieved on April 16, 2019.

Imagen Nuevo Laredo (26 Mayo, 2017) ORADEL, NEW SPONSOR OF THE BULLS OF NUEVO LAREDO. Retrieved on April 16, 2019.

El Semanario Newspaper (22 Agosto, 2018). Nave X opened in Oradel Industrial Park in Nuevo Laredo. Retrieved on May 28, 2019.

La Silla Rota Newspaper (20 Agosto, 2018) Governor of Tamaulipas inaugurates the Tenth Warehouse of the Oradel Industrial Park. Retrieved on May 28, 2019.

Hoy Tamaulipas Newspaper (16 Agosto, 2018) Grupo Modelo invests in Nuevo Laredo. Retrieved on May 28, 2019.

El Mañana Newspaper (12 Mayo, 2017) Oradel Park will have renewable energy with industrial growth. Retrieved on May 28, 2019.

Hoy Tamaulipas Newspaper (22 Marzo, 2018) Facilities of Nuevo Laredo grant facilities to build more companies. Retrieved on May 28, 2019.

El Mañana Newspaper (03 Marzo, 2015) Expands Medline plant in Oradel. Retrieved on May 28, 2019.

Hoy Tamaulipas Newspaper (31 Mayo, 2018) New Laredo continues to advance in industrial growth. Retrieved on May 28, 2019.

El Mañana Newspaper (04 Agosto, 2017) New maquiladora and expansion will give 3 thousand jobs.  Retrieved on May 28, 2019.

Nuevo Laredo
Buildings and structures in Tamaulipas
Industrial parks